The southern Marquesan reed warbler (Acrocephalus mendanae) is a species of Old World warbler in the family Acrocephalidae.

It was formerly considered conspecific with the northern Marquesan reed warbler, and together known as the Marquesan reed warbler.

It is found only on the southern Marquesan Islands.

Subspecies include:
 Uapou Marquesan warbler, Acrocephalus mendanae dido
 nominate (Hiva Oa, Tahuata), Acrocephalus mendanae mendanae
 Mohotani Marquesan warbler, Acrocephalus mendanae consobrina
 Fatuhiva Marquesan warbler, Acrocephalus mendanae fatuhivae

References 

southern Marquesan reed warbler
Birds of the Marquesas Islands
southern Marquesan reed warbler
Taxa named by Henry Baker Tristram
Endemic birds of French Polynesia